S. Janaki is an Indian singer who has sung over 10,000 songs in various Indian languages. The following is a list of Tamil songs recorded by her:

film songs

1950s

1960s

1970s

1980s

1980

1981

1982

1983

1984

1985

1986

1987

1988

1989

1990s

1990

1991

1992

1993

1994

1995

1996

1997

1998

1999

2000s

2010s

References

Janaki, S.